Adrian Quist defeated Jack Crawford 6–3, 6–1, 6–2 in the final to win the men's singles tennis title at the 1940 Australian Championships.

Seeds
The seeded players are listed below. Adrian Quist is the champion; others show the round in which they were eliminated.

 John Bromwich (semifinals)
 Adrian Quist (champion)
 Harry Hopman (quarterfinals)
 Jack Crawford (finalist)
 Vivian McGrath (semifinals)
 Max Newcombe (quarterfinals)
 Bill Sidwell (quarterfinals)
 Jack Harper (second round)

Draw

Key
 Q = Qualifier
 WC = Wild card
 LL = Lucky loser
 r = Retired

Finals

Earlier rounds

Section 1

Section 2

External links
 

1940 in Australian tennis
1950
Men's Singles